Digrammia sexpunctata, the six-spotted digrammia, is a moth in the family Geometridae described by J. Elwyn Bates in 1886. It is found in North America.

The MONA or Hodges number for Digrammia sexpunctata is 6387.1.

References

Further reading
 American Insects: A Handbook of the Insects of America North of Mexico, Ross H. Arnett. 2000. CRC Press.
 Ferguson, Douglas C. / Hodges, R. W., et al., eds. (2008). Geometroidea: Geometridae (part), Ennominae (Part - Abraxini, Cassymini, Macariini). The Moths of North America North of Mexico, fasc. 17.2, 430.

External links
Butterflies and Moths of North America
Original description by J. Elwyn Bates as Semiothisa sex-punctata in The Canadian Entomologist

Macariini